Sir George Savile, 7th Baronet of Thornhill FRS (10 February 1678 – 16 September 1743), of Rufford Nottinghamshire, was an English politician who sat in the House of Commons from 1728 to 1734.

Savile was the son of Rev. John Savile, rector of Thornhill, Yorkshire and his second wife Barbara Jenison, daughter of Thomas Jenison of Newcastle. He was admitted at Middle Temple in 1691 and matriculated at Christ Church, Oxford in 1696. He succeeded his cousin Sir John Savile, 6th Baronet in 1704, inheriting Rufford Abbey. He had two sisters; Ann and Gertrude.

Savile was appointed High Sheriff of Nottinghamshire for the year 1706 to 1707. He was returned as  Member of Parliament (MP) for Yorkshire at a by-election in 1728 and sat until the 1734 British general election.

Savile was elected a Fellow of the Royal Society in November, 1721.

Savile married Mary Pratt, the daughter of John Pratt of Dublin (but reputedly the natural daughter of Henry Petty, 1st Earl of Shelburne) and had three children; Arabella, George (8th Baronet), and Barbara, who married Richard Lumley-Saunderson, 4th Earl of Scarbrough.

References

External links
 Twitter feed of Gertrude's diairies. 

1678 births
1743 deaths
Savile, George, 7th Baronet
Members of the Parliament of Great Britain for English constituencies
Fellows of the Royal Society
High Sheriffs of Nottinghamshire
People from Newark and Sherwood (district)